Białystok constituency is a Polish parliamentary constituency  that is coterminous with the Podlaskie Voivodeship.  It elects fourteen members of the Sejm.

The district has the number '24', and is named after the city of Białystok.  It includes the counties of Augustów, Białystok, Bielsk, Grajewo, Hajnówka, Kolno, Łomża, Mońki, Sejny, Siemiatycze, Sokółka, Suwałki, Wysokie Mazowieckie, and Zambrów and the city counties of Białystok, Łomża, and Suwałki.

List of members

2019-2023

Footnotes

Electoral districts of Poland
Białystok
Podlaskie Voivodeship